The 2017–2018 session was a session of the California State Legislature. The session first convened on December 5, 2016, and adjourned sine die on November 30, 2018.

Major events

Vacancies and special elections 
 July 11, 2017: Democratic assemblymember Jimmy Gomez (51st–Echo Park) resigns to take a seat in Congress.
 November 27, 2017: Democratic assemblymember Raul Bocanegra (39th–Pacoima) resigns in the wake of sexual harassment allegations.
 December 16, 2017: Democrat Wendy Carrillo of Boyle Heights is sworn into office after winning the December 5, 2017, special election for the 51st State Assembly district to replace Gomez.
 December 31, 2017: Democratic assemblymember Sebastian Ridley-Thomas (54th–Los Angeles) resigns for health reasons.
 January 2, 2018: Democratic assemblymember Matt Dababneh (45th–Encino) resigns in the wake of sexual harassment allegations.
 February 22, 2018: Democratic senator Tony Mendoza (32nd–Artesia) resigns in the wake of sexual misconduct allegations.
 April 16, 2018: Democrat Sydney Kamlager of Los Angeles is sworn into office after winning the April 3, 2018, special election for the 54th State Assembly district to replace Ridley-Thomas.
 June 11, 2018: Democrat Luz Rivas of North Hollywood is sworn into office after winning the June 5, 2018, special election for the 39th State Assembly district to replace Bocanegra. Democrat Jesse Gabriel of Encino is sworn into office after winning the June 5, 2018, special election for the 45th State Assembly district to replace Dababneh.
 June 25, 2018: Republican Ling Ling Chang of Diamond Bar is sworn into office after Democrat Josh Newman was recalled in a June 5, 2018 recall election in the 29th State Senate district.
 August 14, 2018: Democrat Vanessa Delgado of Montebello is sworn into office after winning the August 7, 2018, special election for the 32nd State Senate district to replace Mendoza.

Leadership changes 
 April 12, 2017: Republican senator Patricia Bates (36th–Laguna Niguel) replaces senator Jean Fuller (16th–Bakersfield) as Senate minority leader, as Fuller is termed out at the end of the session.
 September 18, 2017: Republican assemblymember Brian Dahle (1st–Bieber) replaces assemblymember Chad Mayes (42nd–Yucca Valley) as Assembly minority leader, as Mayes was ousted in the wake of his support for renewing California's cap-and-trade program.
 March 21, 2018: Democratic senator Toni Atkins (39th–San Diego) replaces senator Kevin de León (24th–Los Angeles) as president pro tempore, as de León is termed out at the end of the session.
 November 8, 2018: Republican assemblymember Marie Waldron (75th–Escondido) replaces assemblymember Brian Dahle (1st–Bieber) as Assembly minority leader, as Dahle planned to run in a special election for the California State Senate.

Party changes

State Senate

Officers 

The Secretary, the Sergeant-at-Arms, and the Chaplain are not members of the Legislature.

Members

State Assembly

Officers 

The Chief Clerk, the acting Chief Sergeant-at-Arms, and the Chaplains are not members of the Legislature.

Members

See also
 List of California state legislatures

References

External links 
 California State Senate
 California State Assembly

2017-18
2017 in California
2018 in California
California
California